Pottikku Potti.. R U Ready ??? (போட்டிக்கு போட்டி நீங்கள் தயாரா?) is a 2022 Indian-Tamil-language reality television show, which premiered on 3 April 2022 and broadcast on Colors Tamil. Baba Bhaskar, Sridhar and Kala as the judges, television host Bhavana Balakrishnan as the hosts. 

The show aired from 3 April 2022, on Sunday at 19:00, and from 9 April, aired on every Saturday and Sunday aired at 20:00 and ended with 33 episodes on 24 July 2022 and available for streaming in selected markets on Voot. The First Season was won by Valli Thirumanam Series Team.

Format
The show is many others from the channel’s popular shows split into Two Teams as Team A and Team B. The teams will have to pull the lever of the machine four times which suggests a task at the end of each spin. The players will then have to execute the command which includes songs, dance performances, quizzes or other fun activities. The game concludes when each team completes its set of tasks. The one with the highest score will be declared the winner over the course of the show.

Overview

Judges and Hosts

Judges

Host

Episodes

References

External links
 

Colors Tamil original programming
Tamil-language television shows
Tamil-language game shows
Tamil-language reality television series
2022 Tamil-language television series debuts
Television shows set in Tamil Nadu
2022 Tamil-language television series endings